Petar Patev (Bulgarian Cyrillic: Петър Патев; born 21 May 1993) is a Bulgarian professional footballer who plays as a defender.

Career
On 22 August 2021, Patev signed for Istiklol on a contract until the end of the 2021 season.

Career statistics

Club

Honours
Istiklol
 Tajikistan Higher League (1): 2021

References

External links

Living people
1993 births
Bulgarian footballers
Association football defenders
Neftochimic Burgas players
PFC Spartak Varna players
FC Dunav Ruse players
PFC Slavia Sofia players
First Professional Football League (Bulgaria) players